The Apollohal is an indoor sports hall located in Amsterdam, the Netherlands. Built in 1934 as a tennis hall, the complex was later designated for expositions and ice skating. Since it was renovated in 2004–2005, it has mainly been used as basketball hall. It is the current home arena of Apollo Amsterdam, a professional team that plays in the Dutch Basketball League (DBL). It was also used by the Amsterdam Astronauts when it was the premier basketball team in the city.

Since 2004, the building is a Rijksmonument and is on the Dutch national heritage site list.

References

Basketball venues in the Netherlands
Sports venues in Amsterdam
Buildings and structures in Amsterdam